is a Japanese racing announcer and former driver. He has raced in the All Japan Touring Car Championship, American Racing Series, IndyCar, and NASCAR.

Racing career
Momota drove in the All Japan Touring Car Championship in the mid to late 1980s. In 1990 he competed in the first two American Racing Series races of the season for TEAMKAR International, finishing 17th and 20th. He attempted to qualify for the 1992 Indianapolis 500 in a car fielded by TEAMKAR but was bumped from the field on the final day of qualifying by Jimmy Vasser. In 1995 he competed in a NASCAR SuperTruck Series race at Phoenix International Raceway driving for Randy MacDonald, becoming the first Japanese NASCAR driver. He crashed 25 laps in and was credited with 37th place.

Post-racing career
Since ending his career, Momota has worked as a racing journalist and announcer. From 2004 to the network's final season of coverage in 2019, he was a color commentator for Nippon TV G+'s NASCAR broadcast.

Motorsports career results

NASCAR
(key) (Bold – Pole position awarded by qualifying time. Italics – Pole position earned by points standings or practice time. * – Most laps led.)

SuperTruck Series

References

External links
 
 

Living people
1962 births
Sportspeople from Tokyo
Japanese racing drivers
Japanese Touring Car Championship drivers
Indy Lights drivers
NASCAR drivers